Reported Missing may refer to:
 Reported Missing!, a 1937 American thriller film
 Reported Missing (1922 film), an American silent comedy film
 Reported Missing (TV series), a British documentary television series